Liverpool Offtake Reservoir (Liverpool Dam) is a small reservoir in Cecil Hills, New South Wales. Built along with the Upper Nepean Scheme it replaced the Liverpool Weir supply.

Built in an old council quarry it was originally used to supply water to Liverpool. Various offtakes were constructed along the Sydney Water Supply Upper Canal for local district supply. It was also used to drain water from the nearby Upper Canal during maintenance.

In 1901 another reservoir at Mount Misery, Heckenberg was constructed between this dam and Liverpool.

References

Reservoirs in Sydney